Petta may refer to:

People
 Bobby Petta, Dutch-Indonesian footballer
 Francesco Miano-Petta, retired amateur Italian freestyle wrestler
 Gustavo Petta, Brazilian politician
 Julia Petta, Italian housewife known as The Italian Bride
 Nicholas Pettas, Greek-Danish karateka
 Nikos Pettas, Greek professional basketball player
 Paolo Petta, Italian computer and cognitive scientist
 Xavier Di Petta, an Australian computer programmer

Other
 Petta (polychaete genus)
 Petta (film), a 2019 Indian film

See also
 Peta (disambiguation)
 Pettah (disambiguation)